The Minnesota Music Academy is a non-profit music institution in Minnesota.  The Academy promotes the Minnesota Music Awards, which it gives out, and also operates a music festival called The Icebreaker.

External links
Minnesota Music Academy

Music of Minnesota
Performing arts in Minnesota
Non-profit organizations based in Minnesota